is the 13th single by Japanese singer/songwriter Mari Hamada, from the album Tomorrow. Written by Hamada and Takashi Masuzaki, the single was released by MCA Victor on October 10, 1991. It was used by Victor for their "Interiart" television commercial.

The song was re-recorded by Hamada in English as "Color Blind" for her 1993 international album Introducing... Mari Hamada.

The single Peaked at No. 9 on Oricon's singles chart.

Track listing

Personnel 
 Michael Landau – guitar
 John Pierce – bass
 Randy Kerber – keyboards
 John Keane – drums

Chart positions

References

External links 
 
 

1991 singles
1991 songs
Japanese-language songs
Mari Hamada songs
Universal Music Japan singles